The common baskettail (Epitheca cynosura) is a dragonfly of the Corduliidae family.
The thorax is brown and hairy.  
Some specimens have a triangular spot at the base of the hindwing.
Individuals are difficult to distinguish from the other species in this genus.
The caudal appendages (structures at the tip of the abdomen) differ between the species and
can be compared with known drawings or close-up photos.
Their flight season can begin as early as January and extends to August.
They may also be seen October to December in north Florida.

Etymology 

This is the most common baskettail within its range, hence the name.
The scientific name, cynosura, means dog tail, and possibly refers to way the cerci at the end of the abdomen curve outward like a dog wagging its tail one way then the other.

References

External links
 Epitheca cynosura on BugGuide.Net

Corduliidae
Odonata of North America
Insects of Canada
Insects of the United States
Insects described in 1839